Sergejs Kožans (born 16 February 1986) is a Latvian former football defender, who played as a defender. He is currently first-team coach at Riga.

Club career
As a youth player Kožans played for JFC Skonto, making his professional debut in 2005. He spent 4 years playing for Skonto Riga in the Latvian Higher League, all in all making 51 appearances and scoring 5 goals. In 2009, alongside his team-mate Ivans Lukjanovs, Kožans joined the Polish Ekstraklasa side Lechia Gdańsk. In his first season with Lechia Kožans played 18 matches and scored 1 goal. All in all he spent three seasons in the Ekstraklasa, playing 42 matches and scoring 1 goal. On 24 May 2012 it was announced that Kožans would leave the club. He became an unrestricted free agent, and on 13 October 2012 joined the Belarusian Premier League club Shakhtyor Soligorsk, signing a contract until the end of the season. They finished the 2012 Belarusian Premier League season as the runners-up. In March 2013 Kožans joined the fellow league club Slavia Mozyr. He played 5 league matches for the club, but then left because of personal reasons. In August 2013 Kožans returned to his former club Skonto Rīga in the Latvian Higher League. In August 2014 he left the club because of its financial difficulties and unpaid wages, having played 15 league matches and scored 2 goals. On 7 August 2014 it was announced that Kožans would join the Polish First League club GKS Tychy.

International career
From 2003 to 2004 Kožans played for Latvia U-17 and from 2006 to 2008 he was a member of Latvia U-21 squad. However, he has not been capped for the senior side yet.

Coaching career
In January 2023, Kožans returned to Riga as a first-team coach.

References

External links
 
 

1986 births
Living people
Latvian footballers
Footballers from Riga
Latvian people of Russian descent
Latvian expatriate footballers
Expatriate footballers in Poland
Expatriate footballers in Belarus
Expatriate footballers in Lithuania
Latvian expatriate sportspeople in Poland
Ekstraklasa players
Skonto FC players
Lechia Gdańsk players
FC Shakhtyor Soligorsk players
FC Slavia Mozyr players
GKS Tychy players
FC Šiauliai players
Bytovia Bytów players
FK Spartaks Jūrmala players
Riga FC players
Association football defenders
Latvian football managers